The Treaty of Alexandropol was a peace treaty between the First Republic of Armenia and the Grand National Assembly of Turkey. The treaty ended the Turkish-Armenian War that had begun on 12 September 1920, with the Turkish invasion of former-Ottoman lands ceded to Armenia in the Treaty of Sevres, a month prior. 

It was signed by the Armenian Foreign Minister Alexander Khatisyan in the early hours of 3 December 1920. However, the previous day, the Armenian government in Yerevan had resigned and transferred power to a Soviet government, backed by Soviet Russia and so Khatisyan was no longer acting on behalf of the government of Armenia, and the treaty was technically invalid.

The terms of the treaty was prepared by the Turks, with the Armenians having no input. It required Armenia to cede to Turkey its entire province of Kars together with the Surmalu district of Yerevan province. A large part of the south of Yerevan province was also to be ceded to Azerbaijan.

The second item on the treaty acknowledged the border between the two countries. The Treaty of Alexandropol changed the boundary of the First Republic of Armenia to the Ardahan-Kars borderline and ceded over half of First Republic of Armenia to the Grand National Assembly of Turkey. The tenth item in the agreement stated that Armenia renounced the Treaty of Sèvres.

The Treaty of Alexandropol was to be ratified by the Armenian Parliament within a month. That did not take place because Soviet Russia occupied Armenia. In the agreement signed by the resigning Armenian government and Soviet Russia's representatives in Yerevan, Russia recognised the boundaries of Armenia as they had been before the Turkish invasion. However, Soviet Russia eventually acceded to Turkey's territorial demands at the Treaty of Moscow, signed on 16 March 1921. It was further ratified as the Treaty of Kars, signed by the Grand National Assembly of Turkey and, at Soviet Russia's insistence, the three now-Soviet republics of Armenia, Georgia, and Azerbaijan.

See also
Armenia–Turkey border
Treaty of Kars

References

Turkish–Armenian War
1920 in Armenia
1920 in the Ottoman Empire
Treaties concluded in 1920
Peace treaties of Turkey
Armenia–Turkey relations
Treaties of the First Republic of Armenia